This is a list of theatrical animated feature films produced or released by Warner Bros., a division of Warner Bros. Discovery. Warner Bros. releases films from Warner-owned and non-Warner owned animation studios. Most films listed below were produced by Warner Bros. divisions, but Warner Bros. has also released films produced by other production companies, such as United Productions of America and Don Bluth Ireland Ltd. Additionally, Warner Bros.'s Japanese division has helped co-produce and release anime films in that country, such as Summer Wars and Puella Magi Madoka Magica: The Movie.

NOTE: Although Warner Bros. handled overseas theatrical distribution of Disney films from 1988 to 1992, Disney titles are not included in this list.

Films

US releases

Upcoming

International releases

Highest grossing films

Notes 
Release Notes

Studio/Production Notes

See also 
 List of Warner Bros. films

References

External links 
 

American animated films
Warner Bros. animated films
Lists of Warner Bros. films
Lists of American animated films